Tripodion tetraphyllum is a species of annual herb in the family Fabaceae. They have a self-supporting growth form and compound, broad leaves. Individuals can grow to 0.2 m.

Sources

References 

Loteae
Flora of Malta